American Hustle is a 2013 American crime comedy-drama film directed by David O. Russell. The screenplay, written by Eric Warren Singer and Russell, is based on the FBI ABSCAM operation of the late 1970s and early 1980s. It was filmed in Boston, Worcester, and New York City. It stars an ensemble cast of Christian Bale, Amy Adams, Bradley Cooper, Jeremy Renner and Jennifer Lawrence.

Columbia Pictures initially provided a limited release to American Hustle at six theaters on December 13, 2013. It was later given a wide release at over 2,500 theaters in the United States and Canada on December 20. The film grossed a worldwide total of over $251 million on a budget of $40 million. As of 2019, it is also Russell's highest-grossing film to date. Rotten Tomatoes, a review aggregator, surveyed 280 reviews and judged 93% to be positive.

At the 86th Academy Awards, American Hustle joint-led the nominations with Gravity, both earning ten nominations each. It was also the fifteenth film in Oscar history to be nominated in all four acting categories. However, the film did not win any awards at the ceremony. At the 71st Golden Globe Awards, the film garnered seven nominations, going on to win Best Motion Picture – Musical or Comedy, Best Actress – Musical or Comedy for Adams, and Best Supporting Actress for Lawrence. American Hustle was nominated for ten British Academy Film Awards and went on to win Best Actress in a Supporting Role for Lawrence, Best Original Screenplay, and Best Makeup and Hair. At the 20th Screen Actors Guild Awards, the film won Outstanding Performance by a Cast in a Motion Picture. It was also nominated at the Directors Guild Awards, Producers Guild Awards, and Writers Guild Awards. The American Film Institute included the film in their list of Top Ten Films of 2013.

Accolades

See also
 2013 in film

References

External links
 

Lists of accolades by film